Gallium acetylacetonate, also referred to as  Ga(acac)3, is a coordination complex with formula Ga(C5H7O2)3. This gallium complex with three acetylacetonate ligands is used in research.  The molecule has D3 symmetry, being isomorphous with other octahedral tris(acetylacetonate)s.

Uses
Gallium oxide thin films can be produced by atomic layer epitaxy (ALE) by combining gallium acetylacetonate with either water or ozone as the precursor. Ga(acac)3 can also be used for low temperature growth of high purity gallium nitride nano-wires and nano-needles.

References

Gallium compounds
Acetylacetonate complexes